The 1999 Nigerian Senate election in Bayelsa State was held on February 20, 1999, to elect members of the Nigerian Senate to represent Bayelsa State. David Brigidi representing Bayelsa Central and Melford Okilo representing Bayelsa East won on the platform of Peoples Democratic Party, while Tupele-Ebi Diffa representing Bayelsa West won on the platform of the Alliance for Democracy.

Overview

Summary

Results

Bayelsa Central 
The election was won by David Brigidi of the Peoples Democratic Party.

Bayelsa East 
The election was won by Melford Okilo of the Peoples Democratic Party.

Bayelsa West 
The election was won by Tupele-Ebi Diffa of the Alliance for Democracy.

References 

Bay
1999 Bayelsa State elections
Bayelsa State Senate elections